This is a list of notable Filipino comedians.

See also 

 List of comedians 
 Comedy in the Philippines

Notes and references

 
Comedians